Santa Rosalía de Camargo, originally called Santa Rosalía, and now known as "Ciudad Camargo" (Camargo City), is a city in the eastern part of the Mexican state of Chihuahua, located at the confluence of the Rio Parral and the Rio Conchos in the Allende Valley. It serves as the municipal seat of Camargo municipality and also serves as an important agricultural and livestock center for the area.  Ciudad Camargo was originally founded in 1740 and refounded in 1792.

Coat of Arms
In the upper part of the city's Coat of Arms, the following terms appear: TRABAJO 1792 NOBLEZA ("Work-1792-Nobility"), which represents the original motto of the city and its refounding date. It appears above a profile of the mountains along the Conchos River. In the center is the figure of a Spaniard on horseback; below that, the historic Municipal Presidency building and the head of a Tarahumara Indian wearing a collar appear facing each other, seen in profile. These figures are flanked by smoking chimneys that symbolize the industry of the city. The lower part displays a walnut tree planted at the confluence of two rivers, which flow downward to a cross rising from a sun in which Apache arrows appear, symbolizing the depopulation of the old settlement of the region by the attack of these indigenous groups. Under the left river branch, agriculture is represented with a pheasant; under the right river branch, livestock is represented with a cow skull.

A sheath of maize appears along each side of the shield. On the lower apex of the shield appears the city's name: SANTA ROSALÍA DE CAMARGO.

History
The lands located between the existing town of San Francisco de Conchos and the confluence of the Río Concho and Río Florido rivers were explored by Francisco Escárcega on June 12, 1687, at the direction of the Governor of Nueva Vizcaya, Don José de Neyra y Quiroga. In 1740, the site at the confluence of the Río Concho and Río Parral rivers was established as a town with the name of Santa Rosalía for the Catholic missionaries who were assigned to administer in the area.

In 1745, Apache raiders from further north began looting and terrorizing Spanish settlements through the entire Allende Valley. They attacked the town of San Francisco de Conchos on March 25, when they killed the Franciscan missionary friars Tomás de Zigarán and Francisco de Labado who served the mission. They also burned the church and the friars' house. The Apaches then immediately attacked the town of San Pedro de Conchos; there, the missionary left before befalling any harm and took refuge with the Jesuits in Satevó. From Valle de Allende, the friars and Spanish residents were evacuated to Villa López before the raiders arrived; but they were unable to prevent the Apache from burning the convent and the sanctuary.

General Francisco Montaño de la Cueva led the campaign against the insurgents, rounding them up and immediately imposing the peace. But he hanged thirteen of the native leaders determined to be responsible for the uprising and the death of the missionaries in the Allende Valley.

The attacks of the Apache raiders caused an abandonment of the town, but it was re-established and repopulated on November 25, 1792 with the same name of Santa Rosalía by the Captain Jose Manuel Ochoa, taking orders from General Pedro de Nava, General Commander of the Internal Provinces. The town was re-established with 28 neighbors brought from the Presidio of Conchos, which continued to impose oversight and control over the town until 1820, when the town was given the category of Municipality under the restored Spanish Constitution of Cádiz. In 1826, the community was made part of the political district of Rosales; in 1837, it was included in the sub-prefecture of Jiménez; in 1847, included in the Cantón Jiménez; in 1859, separated to create the Canton Camargo; and from 1887 to 1911, it was included in the Camargo District. In 1897, after 100 years of life, at the request of the Camargan deputy Pedro Carbajal, the local Congress granted the community the title of City with the name of Camargo in honor of the Caudillo insurgent Ignacio Camargo who was shot in Chihuahua during the War of Independence on May 10, 1811.

On August 31, 1860 in Santa Rosalía, Captain Jesus Duarte, with a section of Liberal troops, defeated the Conservative leader Jose Macias, who was left lying on the field with 32 dead and several wounded.

On September 1, 1876, Mayor José Perfecto Lomelín, declared the local government to be in favor of the Tuxtepec Plan and occupied the Plaza de Camargo, which had previously been under the control of Governor Manuel de Herrera and the Chihuahua National Guard.

On April 23, 1913, Constitutionalist Generals Manuel Chao, Rosalío Hernández and Maclovio Herrera attacked the Plaza de Camargo that had become occupied by Huerta troops under the command of General Manuel García Pueblita. The Constitutionalist troops were defeated, leaving the Plaza and the City in the hands of the assailants.

On December 12, 1916, General Francisco Villa attacked and captured the Plaza de Camargo, defended by General Rosalío Hernández with government troops from where they were evicted. All the captured prisoners were shot on Villa's orders.

On January 5, 2017 at the Camargo toll booth on State Highway 45, about a thousand citizens demonstrated against the "gasolinazo" (gasoline tax rise). The State Police were dispatched to end the demonstration; when they arrived, rather than confronting the officers, the demonstrators raised their hands in mass to show that they did not carry weapons, then sat down and sang the National Anthem with one voice. The act was unprecedented in national history.

Climate
Carmargo has a semi-arid climate (Köppen climate classification BSh) with mild winters and hot summers. Precipitation is sparse though it is higher from July to September.

Neighborhoods of Camargo
The Camargo's Municipality has 248 "Colonias" (neighborhoods) and "Zonas Conurbadas" which make the entire city.

Population
Camargo is ethnically diverse, but mostly of European origin, composed primarily of Spanish, Mestizos, Basque, Portuguese, French, Italian, German, Mennonites, South African Boers, and Conchos Indians.
As of 2010, the city had a total population of 40,221, up from 39,149 as of 2005.

Tourism
Tourism is a popular activity and a generating potential of currencies, because Camargo City and vicinity possesses a great number of natural attractions, the most popular being:
 Colina lake With calm waters where one can practice different aquatic sports, as water skiing, jet skiing, and boating.
 "Ojo Caliente" Resort With thermal and sulphurous waters, located 4 km from Camargo.
 Los Filtros With birth of moderate templated waters, it is located to only 30 km from Camargo's city
 Presa la Boquilla is located to the southwest of the city, one of the most beautiful and interesting places of the region.

Interesting places to go
 Plaza Juarez (park)
 City Hall
 "Puerta de Camargo" monument
 Santa Rosalia Church
 Santuario Church
 "Acueducto" monument
 Bicentenary Park
 Rancho El Floreno
 "Faro" monument
 "Lucha Villa Statue"

Commerce
Besides tourism, The region is known for agriculture, cattle, corn, pecan trees and its surrounding mountains. Wheat, sorghum, cotton, soy bean, maize (corn), beans, chilis, alfalfa, and onions are all grown in the area. Nuts, grapes, apricots, watermelon, melons, pears, plums, and peaches are also grown there.

The Tarahumara Indians living up in the mountains outside of the city regularly come into Ciudad Camargo to sell produce and other goods to the local populace.

Schools in Ciudad Camargo

Notable people from Camargo, Chihuahua
 Velia Aguilar Armendáriz, Mexican politician
 David Alfaro Siqueiros, Mexican social realist painter (Originally from Chihuahua, Chihuahua)
 Luis H. Álvarez, Mexican industrialist and politician
 Socorro Bonilla, Mexican actress
 Alma Delfina, Mexican actress
 Práxedes Giner Durán, Mexican military official (General officer), politician (Governor of Chihuahua) and member of the Institutional Revolutionary Party (PRI)
 Oka Giner, Mexican actress
 Aarón Hernán, Mexican telenovela and film actor
 Sebastián, Mexican sculptor
 María Sorté, Mexican actress and singer
 Lucha Villa, Mexican singer and actress (Golden Age of Mexican cinema)

References

Link to tables of population data from Census of 2005 INEGI: Instituto Nacional de Estadística, Geografía e Informática
Chihuahua  Enciclopedia de los Municipios de México

External links
Official website of the Municipality of Camargo

Rio Conchos
Populated places in Chihuahua (state)
1740 establishments in the Spanish Empire